The Great Reset Initiative is an economic recovery plan drawn up by the World Economic Forum (WEF) in response to the COVID-19 pandemic. The project was launched in June 2020, with a video featuring the then Prince of Wales Charles released to mark its launch. The initiative's stated aim is to facilitate rebuilding from the global COVID-19 crisis in a way which prioritises sustainable development.

WEF chief executive officer Klaus Schwab described three core components of the Great Reset: creating conditions for a "stakeholder economy"; building in a more "resilient, equitable, and sustainable" way, utilising environmental, social, and governance (ESG) metrics; and "harness[ing] the innovations of the Fourth Industrial Revolution." In her speech opening the dialogues, International Monetary Fund director Kristalina Georgieva listed three key aspects of a sustainable response to COVID-19: green growth, smarter growth, and fairer growth.

"The Great Reset" was to be the theme of the 2021 World Economic Forum annual summit in Davos, Switzerland, scheduled for January 2021. Due to disruption from COVID-19, the summit was postponed to May 2021, and again to 2022. The Davos 2022 theme was "History at a Turning Point", and the summit was dominated by the Russian invasion of Ukraine.

The Great Reset Initiative, and the World Economic Forum more generally, have been criticised by some commentators for promoting economic deregulation and a greater role in policy for unrepresentative private businesses, particularly large multinational corporations, at the expense of government institutions. Other commentators held that the Great Reset, if achieved, would lead to an ultra-conservative, "neo-medieval world health" order or crony capitalism.

The initiative triggered a range of diverse conspiracy theories spread by right-wing, American far-right and conservative and commentators on social media such as Facebook and Twitter. Such theories include baseless claims that the COVID-19 pandemic was created by a secret group in order to seize control of the global economy, that lockdown restrictions were deliberately designed to induce economic meltdown, or that a global elite was attempting to abolish private property while using COVID-19 to enslave humanity with vaccines. Great Reset conspiracy theories increased in intensity when leaders such as U.S. president Joe Biden, New Zealand prime minister Jacinda Ardern and Canadian prime minister Justin Trudeau incorporated ideas of a post-COVID-19 "reset" in their speeches.

Key components 

By mid-April 2020, against the backdrop of the COVID-19 pandemic, the COVID-19 recession, the 2020 Russia–Saudi Arabia oil price war and the resulting "collapse in oil prices", the former Governor of the Bank of England, Mark Carney, described possible fundamental changes in an article in The Economist. Carney said that in a post-COVID world "stakeholder capitalism" will be tested as "companies will be judged by "what they did during the war", how they treated their employees, suppliers and customers, by who shared and who hoarded." The "gulf between what markets value and what people value" will close. In a post-COVID world, it is reasonable to expect that more people will want improvements in risk management, in social and medical safety nets, and will want more attention paid to scientific experts. This new hierarchy of values will call for a reset on the way we deal with climate change, which, like the pandemic, is a global phenomenon. No one can "self-isolate" from climate change so we all need to "act in advance and in solidarity". In his 2020 BBC Reith Lectures, Carney developed his theme of value hierarchies as related to three crises—credit, COVID and climate.

According to a May 15, 2020 WEF article, COVID-19 offers an opportunity to "reset and reshape" the world in a way that is more aligned with the United Nations 2030 Sustainable Development Goals (SDG), as climate change, inequality and poverty gained even greater urgency during the pandemic. This includes resetting labour markets, as more people work remotely speeding up the process of the "future of work". The reset will advance work already begun to prepare for the transition to the Fourth Industrial Revolution by upskilling and reskilling workers. Another post-COVID concern raised by the WEF is food security including the "risk of disruptions to food supply chains", and the need for "global policy coordination" to prevent "food protectionism from becoming the post-pandemic new normal".

In her June 3, 2020 keynote address opening the Great Reset forum, a joint initiative of the WEC and then Prince of Wales Charles, Kristalina Georgieva, Managing Director of the International Monetary Fund (IMF) said that there has been a "massive injection of fiscal stimulus to help countries deal with this crisis" and that it was of "paramount importance that this growth should lead to a greener, smarter, fairer world in the future". Georgieva listed three aspects of the Great Reset; green growth, smarter growth and fairer growth. Government investments and government incentives for private investors could "support low-carbon and climate-resilient growth" such as "planting mangroves, land restoration, reforestation or insulating buildings". With low oil prices, the timing was right to eliminate fossil fuel subsidies and introduce carbon pricing to incentivize future investments. The COVID-19 pandemic presents an opportunity to shape an economic recovery and the future direction of global relations, economies and priorities.

In June 2020, Klaus Schwab, who founded the World Economic Forum (WEF) in 1971 and is currently its CEO, described the three core components of the Great Reset. The first includes creating conditions for a "stakeholder economy"; improving policies and agreements on taxes, regulations, fiscal policies and trade to result in "fairer outcomes". The second component addresses how the large-scale pandemic spending programs with private investments and pension funds could improve on the old system by building one that is more "resilient, equitable and sustainable" over the long term by "building green urban infrastructure and creating incentives for industries to improve their track record on environmental, social and governance (ESG) metrics". The third component of a Great Reset agenda is to "harness the innovations of the Fourth Industrial Revolution" for the public good. A July 2020 non-fiction by Schwab and economist Thierry Malleret develops the plan in more detail.

In one of the Great Reset Dialogues, John Kerry and other members of a WEF dialogue discussed how to rebuild the "social contract" in a post-COVID world.

In a comment according to Charles III (then Prince of Wales), the economic recovery must put the world on a path to sustainability, which would include carbon pricing. He emphasized that the private sector would be the main drivers of the plan. The market should adapt to the current reality by aiming for fairer results, ensuring that investments are aimed at mutual progress including accelerating ecologically friendly investments, and to start a fourth industrial revolution, creating digital economic and public infrastructure.

According to Schwab, they would not change the economic system, but rather improve it to what he considers to be "responsible capitalism". The Brookings Institution described this three-point plan in response to the COVID-19 crisis; response, recovery and reset. For the near term it involves response. In the medium term this involves "rebuilding economic and social activity in a manner that protects public health, promotes societal healing and preserves the environment". The reset is for systems over the long term of establishing through our "collective imagination" a great reset; a "new equilibrium among political, economic, social and environmental systems toward common goals".

Fourth Industrial Revolution 

Klaus Schwab used the concept of a "Fourth Industrial Revolution" in a 2015 article published by Foreign Affairs, and in 2016, the theme of the World Economic Forum annual meeting in Davos-Klosters, Switzerland, was "Mastering the Fourth Industrial Revolution". In his 2015 article, Schwab said that the first industrial revolution was powered by "water and steam" to "mechanize production". Through electrical power, the second industrial revolution introduced mass production. Electronics and information technologies automated the production process in the third industrial revolution. In the fourth industrial revolution the lines between "physical, digital and biological spheres" have become blurred and this current revolution, which began with the digital revolution in the mid-1990s, is "characterized by a fusion of technologies". This fusion of technologies included "fields such as artificial intelligence, robotics, the Internet of Things, autonomous vehicles, 3-D printing, nanotechnology, biotechnology, materials science, energy storage and quantum computing."

Just before the 2016 annual WEF meeting of the Global Future Councils, Ida Auken, a Danish MP who was also a young global leader and a member of the Council on Cities and Urbanization, wrote an article that was uploaded to the official WEF website and later republished by Forbes in which she imagined how technology could improve our lives by 2030 if the United Nations sustainable development goals (SDG) were realized through this fusion of technologies. In the scenario presented by Auken, the emergence and application of new digitized technologies to sectors such as communication, energy, transportation, and accommodation would result in greater access and decreased cost (ultimately leading to a complete elimination of cost), eventually leading to the end of "lifestyle diseases, climate change, the refugee crisis, environmental degradation, completely congested cities, water pollution, air pollution, social unrest and unemployment" as well as other early 21st century crises. By the scenario's 2030 endpoint, anything that had once been a product was now a freely available service, obviating any need for personal ownership of goods or real estate. The article, originally titled "Welcome to 2030. I own nothing, have no privacy, and life has never been better", has been criticized as portraying an unrealistic utopia at the cost of privacy. In response, Auken added an author's note in which she said that the article merely represented a potential future scenario rather than any personal utopia of her own and that it was intended to "start a discussion about some of the pros and cons of the current technological development" in a way that she claimed conventional reports could not, while the article itself was renamed to "Here's how life could change in my city by the year 2030". Both versions of the article describe the loss of privacy as undesirable.

While the "interest in Fourth Industrial Revolution technologies" had "spiked" during the COVID-19 pandemic, fewer than 9% of companies were using machine learning, robotics, touch screens and other advanced technologies. An October 21, 2020 WEF virtual panel discussed how organizations could harness fourth revolution technologies. On January 28, 2021, Davos Agenda virtual panel discussed how artificial intelligence (AI) will "fundamentally change the world". 63% of CEOs believe that "AI will have a larger impact than the Internet."

During 2020, the Great Reset Dialogues resulted in multi-year projects, such as the digital transformation programme where cross-industry stakeholders investigate how the 2020 "dislocative shock" had increased and "accelerated digital transformations". Their report said that, while "digital ecosystems will represent more than $60 trillion in revenue by 2025", "only 9% of executives [in July 2020] say their leaders have the right digital skills".

Endorsements 

Political leaders such as Canadian Prime Minister Justin Trudeau, U.S. President Joe Biden and former New Zealand Prime Minister Jacinda Ardern have endorsed the idea of "building back better", as has former UK Prime Minister Boris Johnson.

In Autumn 2020, Time magazine published a series entitled "The Great Reset: How to Build a Better World Post-COVID-19", which included a collection of articles, columns, talk videos and interviews.

Canada 

In a June 11, 2020 meeting with the then Prince of Wales Charles III and Permanent Representatives to the United Nations from the Commonwealth of Nations, Prime Minister Justin Trudeau spoke regarding the Great Reset initiative. Trudeau said that the Commonwealth, of which Canada is a member country, provides a space for "dialogue and collective action on global issues related to sustainable development" which includes how to "build back stronger, more resilient, and greener economies" in a post-COVID-19 world. This is in line with similar statements made on May 28, 2020, when Trudeau and Andrew Holness, Jamaica's Prime Minister, convened an online meeting of "world leaders and international organizations" to consult on a "global response to the significant economic and human impacts of COVID-19, and advance concrete solutions to the development emergency".

In his August presentation entitled "The Great Reset", at the Victoria Forum 2020, the Governor of the Bank of Canada described how COVID-19 is resulting in a "structural shock with broad impact worldwide". He said that governments, investors in the corporate and financial sector—including central banks, and individuals households, need to evaluate risks and prepare for transitions. He recommended the use of scenario analysis, as a way of describing possible and plausible outcomes as we are faced with a "high degree of uncertainty" in terms of climate change, policy, "technological development", and "evolving consumer and investor preferences".

In a September 29, 2020 six-minute virtual address to the UN General Assembly, Prime Minister Trudeau described how "[b]uilding back better" included supporting the most vulnerable, for example by ensuring "equitable access" to COVID-19 vaccine in developing countries, while also working towards reaching the UN's Sustainable Development Goals for 2030.

The media responded to accusations made by Conservative finance critic MP Pierre Poilievre that Trudeau, who had used the term "reset" in his September UN speech, was "harbouring a very ambitious hidden agenda — not just for Canada but for the world", by saying that the WEF agenda is published on its website. Erin O'Toole, who has been the Leader of the Opposition as leader of the Conservative Party of Canada since August 24, 2020, wrote in a November 21 tweet, "It's hard to believe anyone would look at the carnage caused by COVID-19 and see an opportunity". The message was that "Conservatives want to bring back economic certainty" while Liberals want to "reimagine the economy", which O'Toole described as "a massive and risky experiment". The Post said that Poilievre had launched a petition that gathered 70,000 signatures within three days on November 20 in which he cautioned that the Liberals were secretly planning on "re-engineer[ing] economies and societies to empower the elites at the expense of the people" to remodel Canada to Trudeau's alleged "socialist ideology". Poilievre used phrases from Trudeau's September speech to imply that Trudeau's statement that COVID-19 had "provided an opportunity for a reset" to "reimagine economic systems that actually address global challenges like extreme poverty inequality and climate change", was evidence that Trudeau was part of the great reset conspiracy theory, that had been circulating for some time.

United States 

A January 23, 2021 Financial Times article said that policymakers around the world are anticipating President Biden's "reset on trade, tax and climate". Then President-elect Joe Biden had announced in November 2020, John Kerry would be appointed as U.S. Special Presidential Envoy for Climate, and Kerry was confirmed in this position on inauguration day, January 20, 2021. Kerry had participated in one of the Great Reset Dialogues on how to rebuild the "social contract" in a post-COVID world. Kerry said that COVID-19 offered a "big moment" that opened the possibility for the Great Reset. He said the WEF would play a significant role in refining how to respond to climate change and inequalities that were "laid bare as a consequence of COVID-19." The Heartland Institute's editorial director expressed concerns that President Joe Biden, elected in November 2020, would "bring the Great Reset to the United States" and that "the country [would] never be the same."

Netherlands 

In December 2021, the Dutch government published its past correspondence with representatives of the World Economic Forum. The documents, which among others called for the Netherlands to take the lead in implementing the Great Reset, were officially made available by the Dutch government.

New Zealand 

In January 2019, at a World Economic Forum "Safeguarding Our Planet" panel discussion alongside world leaders and broadcaster Sir David Attenborough, New Zealand Prime Minister Jacinda Ardern discussed her governments "Wellbeing Budget" and planned environmental changes. These initiatives have been linked to the World Economic Forum Great Reset in related news articles. In April 2020, the New Zealand Finance Minister Grant Robertson discussed a wellbeing focused post COVID "Recovery Budget" and an opportunity for an economical reset. Other initiatives promoted by the pair include an Artificial Intelligence drive in New Zealand related to the WEF "Globalization 4.0" initiatives to shape a global architecture in the Age of the Fourth Industrial Revolution.

Commentary 

Naomi Klein, in a December 2020 article in The Intercept, described the WEF idea as a "Great Reset Conspiracy Smoothie." She said that it was simply a "coronavirus-themed rebranding" of things that the WEF was already doing and that it was an attempt by the rich to make themselves look good. Klein wrote that Schwab had given each meeting at Davos a theme since 2003. "The Great Reset is merely the latest edition of this gilded tradition, barely distinguishable from earlier Davos Big Ideas."

In his review of the 2020 book co-authored by Schwab and Malleret—and the Great Reset agenda in general—Ben Sixsmith, a contributor to The Spectator, said that the Great Reset was a set of "bad ideas...adopted internationally by some of the richest and most powerful people in the world". Sixsmith described sections of the book as "earnest", glum, dutiful and bland.
Similarly, in his review in the Journal of Value Inquiry of COVID-19: The Great Reset, ethicist Steven Umbrello makes parallel critiques of the agenda. He says that the agenda amounts to nothing other than "a substantial (if not complete) socio-political-economic overhaul" and that such a proposal is a "false dilemma" and that "Schwab and Malleret whitewash a seemingly optimistic future post-Great Reset with buzz words like equity and sustainability even as they functionally jeopardize those admirable goals".

2021 WEF summit 

"The Great Reset" was scheduled to be the theme of 2021 World Economic Forum summit in Davos, but this was postponed repeatedly to 2022. The 2022 Davos summit theme was "History at a Turning Point", and it was dominated by the Russian invasion of Ukraine.

Conspiracy theories 

The term "Great Reset" also known as "Liberal World Order" and "Global Liberal Order", can also refer to a conspiracy theory called New World Order.

Schwab wrote the preface to a 2010 report of the World Economic Forum's  "Global Redesign Initiative", which postulates that a globalized world is best managed by stronger multinational institutions.

According to the Transnational Institute (TNI), the WEF is hence planning to replace a recognised democratic model with a model where a self-selected group of "stakeholders" make decisions on behalf of the people. The think tank summarises that we are increasingly entering a world where gatherings such as Davos are "a silent global coup d'état" to capture governance.

In 2019, WEF conducted a simulated Global pandemic called "Event 201" where world leaders discussed what actions would be taken if such a situation were to occur. This initiative triggered a range of diverse conspiracy theories spread by the American far-right and conservative commentators on social media such as Facebook and Twitter. Such theories include claims that the COVID-19 pandemic was created by a secret group in order to seize control of the global economy, that lockdown restrictions were deliberately designed to induce economic meltdown, or that a global elite was attempting to abolish private property while using COVID-19 to enslave humanity with vaccines.

According to a November 22, 2020 article as part of BBC's "Reality Check" series debunking the theory, those spreading the Great Reset conspiracy theory claim, without evidence, that a "group of world leaders orchestrated the pandemic to take control of the global economy".

A November 2020 article in The Daily Beast said that even before Biden became president, his "incoming White House already ha[d] its first conspiracy theory to deal with"the Great Reset conspiracy theory. Mainstream media outlets such as The New York Times, the BBC, and The Guardian traced the spread of the latest conspiracy theory on the Great Reset, which had integrated anti-lockdown conspiracies, to internet personalities and groups, including Candace Owens, Glenn Beck, Fox News hosts Laura Ingraham, Sean Hannity and Tucker Carlson, and Paul Joseph Watson, the UK-based editor of Alex Jones' website Infowars, where he advanced the New World Order conspiracy theory. Ben Sixsmith wrote that the conspiracy theory had been spread by "fringes of Right-Wing Twitter", as well as by Australia's One Nation party leader Pauline Hanson (a "socialist left Marxist view of the world") and UK conservative writer James Delingpole (a "global communist takeover plan"). However, Sixsmith observed the WEF's partners include such capitalist enterprises as Apple, Microsoft, Facebook, IBM, IKEA, Lockheed Martin, Ericsson and Deloitte.

Many critics have coalesced other grievances with the WEF into allegations about the Great Reset, compounding both the conspiracy theory and more innocuous criticism. Many detractors commonly cite Ida Auken's article on a potential 2030, as well as a 2016 WEF video in which the article was presented alongside other predictions for 2030 and summarized as "You'll own nothing. And you'll be happy. Whatever you want you'll rent and it'll be delivered by drone", as evidence of the Great Reset having malicious intent.

An October 2020 article by Snopes traced the origins of a chain email posted on conspiracy forums from a member of a non-existent committee within the Liberal Party of Canada that leaked Canada's secret "COVID Global Reset Plan" to the QAnon-dedicated "Q Research" board on 8chan.

By November 17, 2020, a short video of Trudeau's speech in which he described key points of the concept of an economic "reset" had gone viral, as it reignited fervor over the Great Reset conspiracy theory that had taken on a new life with the launching of the forum in May. By November 2020,  Maxime Bernier, leader of the People's Party of Canada lamented on his webpage on November 17 that he was the only Canadian politician along with Pierre Poilievre and Colin Carrie, an MP, speaking up against the globalist threat with Trudeau as the "world's most prominent defender" of this Great Reset. Other critics included Canadian conservative political commentators such as Ezra Levant and Alberta's Premier at that time Jason Kenney. They claimed that Trudeau's rhetoric resembled that of the Great Reset conspiracy. Conservative Spencer Fernando stated that, "We want our lives to get back to normal... Instead they offer only more fear, more control, more centralization, and a reshaping of our lives and our economy without even asking us." When Poilievre circulated a petition to "Stop the Reset", Le Devoir headlined an article saying that the Conservative Party was embracing conspiracy theories. The Toronto Star editorial board criticized Poilievre for "giving oxygen" to the conspiracy theory, with some suggesting his post was related to a possible federal election.

A May 2022 article in The Globe and Mail said that "WEF conspiracy theory" was being spread to "Canada's main streets" and was brought up during the leadership race of the Conservative Party of Canada. When Schwab "brags" about Canadian politicians' connections to the WEF, this feeds into "theories of cabals". In 2021, when Schwab said that "half of Canada's cabinet were Young Global Leaders" including Calgary Conservative MP Michelle Rempel Garnerconspiracy theorists interpreted that to mean that Canadian cabinet ministers are "minions" controlled by Schwab. The article called on politicians in Canada who had been "flirting" with the Great Reset conspiracy theories through TwitterConservative leadership candidates Poilievre and Leslyn Lewis quell the distrust by admitting that "there is no such cabal". In September 2022, CBC News tracked the spread of related disinformation and conspiracy theories in Canada.

On December 13, 2020, Australian advertising executive Rowan Dean promoted the conspiracy theory on Sky News Australia, claiming that "This Great Reset is as serious and dangerous a threat to our prosperity – to your prosperity and your freedom – as we have faced in decades".

The conspiracy theory has also been disseminated by Russian propaganda outlets. According to Oliver Kamm, in a 2020 article for the CapX website: "The propaganda apparatus of the Putin regime has for many months published wild allegations from obscure bloggers that the Great Reset is code for oligarchs to amass wealth and control populations." In 2021, the British anti-disinformation organization Logically reported that the website The Exposé has promoted Great Reset conspiracy theories framed as breaking news since its establishment in November 2020.

Great Reset conspiracy theories were a major theme in the 2022 anti-vaccine film Died Suddenly which appeared on the Stew Peters Network channel on the Rumble website.

Book

See also 

 Great Resignation
 Marshall Plan

References

External links 

 World Economic Forum (2020). "Podcasts" (collection including "The Great Reset").
 World Economic Forum (2020). "The Great Reset" (official initiative website).

Conspiracy theories
May 2020 events in Switzerland
International responses to the COVID-19 pandemic
2020 in economics
Economic planning